"The Maid of Brakel" is a German fairy tale collected by the Brothers Grimm in Grimms' Fairy Tales, tale number 115.

It is Aarne-Thompson type 1476A, Praying to the Statue's Mother.

The story is set in Brakel, Germany.

Synopsis
A chapel held a statue of Saint Anne and the Virgin Mary as a child.  An unmarried woman prayed to Saint Anne that she might wed a man.  A clerk, who heard her, said she would not have him.  The woman took it to be the child Mary and scolded her, because she was talking to her mother.

Notes
Saint Anne was the patron saint of unmarried women, particularly because of the legend that she had been married three times.

References

External links

Maid of Brakel
Maid of Brakel
Maid of Brakel
ATU 1440-1524